The men's 400 metres was an event at the 1956 Summer Olympics in Melbourne. The competition was held on 28 & 29 of November. Times are listed as both hand timing and automatic timing. Hand timing was the official time used in the 1956 Olympics. Forty-two athletes from 23 nations competed. The maximum number of athletes per nation had been set at 3 since the 1930 Olympic Congress. 

The event was won by Charles Jenkins Sr. of the United States, the nation's 8th title in the event and breaking a two-Games string of victories by Jamaican runners. Karl-Friedrich Haas's silver was the first medal in the event by the "United Team" of Germany, though Germany had medaled in 1912 and 1928. Finland and the Soviet Union each claimed their first men's 400 metres medals as well with a tie for bronze between Voitto Hellstén and Ardalion Ignatyev.

Summary
Lou Jones entered the Olympics as the world record holder, having first set it in early 1955 in Mexico City, then improving his record at the 1956 United States Olympic Trials. He managed to get into the final expending the minimum effort, running just fast enough to qualify behind the South African Malcolm Spence and ahead of Jamaican Melville Spence, twin brother of the Jamaican Malcolm Spence who ran in the other semi-final. That's three M. Spences in the semi-final round, including two named Malcolm. Four years later, both Malcolms would again make it to the semi-final round and each would leave that Olympics with a bronze medal.

Jones took off from the start of the race, pulling away from the field on the backstretch and reaching the half way point with a 3 metre lead on Ardalion Ignatyev.  But there is a reality to running the 400 meters, Jones' exuberance caught up with him, his movement strained.  The lead began to shrink through the final turn, to barely a metre by the time he reached the home stretch.  More importantly, he had nothing left in the tank for the final sprint.  By that point, his American teammate, Charles Jenkins was only a metre behind Ignatyev and gaining.  With more speed down the final straightaway, in the next 40 metres, Jenkins caught Jones at the same time as Ignatyev.  Jones could only look helplessly while Ignatyev strained.  Another two metres back, Karl-Friedrich Haas was in full flight with Voitto Hellstén another metre behind in his wake.  As Jenkins ran away to gold, Hellstén closed rapidly, the next three runners hitting the finish line virtually at the same time.  With a slight lean at the finish, the tall Haas was given silver, but the photo finish could not separate Hellstén and Ignatyev, both being given the bronze medal.

Background

This was the thirteenth appearance of the event, which is one of 12 athletics events to have been held at every Summer Olympics. Both the Jamaican team (which had gone 1-2 in both 1948 and 1952) and the American team (bronze both years) saw complete turnover; the only finalist left from Helsinki was the German Karl-Friedrich Haas (4th in 1948). Pan American champion and world record holder Lou Jones of the United States, 1955 AAU champion Charles Jenkins Sr. of the United States, and 1954 European champion Ardalion Ignatyev of the Soviet Union were among the favorites.

Ethiopia, Kenya, Liberia, Malaya, Nigeria, and the Philippines appeared in this event for the first time; Germany made its first appearance as the United Team of Germany. The United States made its thirteenth appearance in the event, the only nation to compete in it at every Olympic Games to that point.

Competition format

The competition retained the basic four-round format from 1920. With a smaller field than in 1952, the number of heats was reduced. There were 8 heats in the first round, each with between 4 and 7 athletes. The top three runners in each heat advanced to the quarterfinals. There were 4 quarterfinals of 6 runners each; the top three athletes in each quarterfinal heat advanced to the semifinals. The semifinals featured 2 heats of 6 runners each. The top two runners in each semifinal heat advanced, making a six-man final.

Records

Prior to the competition, the existing World and Olympic records were as follows.

No records were set during this event.

Schedule

All times are Australian Eastern Standard Time (UTC+10)

Results

Heats

The top three runners in each of the eight heats, advanced to the quarterfinal round.

Heat 1

Heat 2

Heat 3

Heat 4

Heat 5

Heat 6

Heat 7

Heat 8

Quarterfinals

The top three runners in each of the four heats, advanced to the semifinal round.

Quarterfinal 1

Quarterfinal 2

Quarterfinal 3

Quarterfinal 4

Semifinals

Top three in each of the two heats advanced to the final round.

Semifinal 1

Semifinal 2

Final

References

External links
Official report

Men's 400 metres
400 metres at the Olympics
Men's events at the 1956 Summer Olympics